Mexico competed in the 2017 Summer Deaflympics which was held in Samsun, Turkey. Mexico sent a delegation consisting of 8 participants for the event. This was only the 4th occasion where Mexico participated at the Summer Deaflympics after making its Deaflympic debut in 2001.

Mexican judoka Maria Huitron clinched the only medal for Mexico at the Deaflympic event after securing the nation's first ever gold medal in the Deaflympic history at the women's Judo event.

Medalists

Medal table

References

External links 
Mexico at the Deaflympics

Nations at the 2017 Summer Deaflympics
2017 in Mexican sports
Mexico at the Deaflympics